Tornike Gorgiashvili (born 27 April 1988) is a Georgian footballer currently under contract for Georgian side FC Dila Gori.

On July 1, 2010, he scored in the Europa League 2010-11 against S.C. Faetano.

External links
 
 

1988 births
Living people
Footballers from Tbilisi
FC Tbilisi players
FC Zestafoni players
FC Dinamo Tbilisi players
FC Samtredia players
Association football midfielders
FC Spartaki Tskhinvali players
FC Chikhura Sachkhere players
FC Saburtalo Tbilisi players
FC Dila Gori players
Georgia (country) international footballers
Footballers from Georgia (country)